Yusefabad (also Romanized as Yūsefābād and Yūsofābād; also known as Maḩalleh-ye Mojāver-e Ḩeşār) is a village in Guney-ye Markazi Rural District, in the Central District of Shabestar County, East Azerbaijan Province, Iran. At the 2006 census, its population was 362, in 92 families.

References 

Populated places in Shabestar County